The Plotnikova is a river in the western Kamchatka Peninsula, Russia, a tributary of the Bolshaya. It is used for spawning by various species of Pacific salmon.

Course

The Plotnikova flows through the Yelizovsky and Ust-Bolsheretsky districts of the Kamchatka Territory. 
The part of the Bolshaya upstream from its confluence with the Plotnikova is named Bystraya.

Settlement

Bolsheretsk was founded in 1703 as a fort on the Plotnikova. 
In 1707 rebels destroyed the fort. In 1711 it was rebuilt where the Bystraya and Plotnikova rivers join to form the Bolshaya, 58 kilometres from the river mouth on the Sea of Okhotsk.
In the late 1920s the village was abandoned and the inhabitants moved to the new village of Kavalerskoye, and to village of Ust-Bolsheretsk at the mouth of the Bolshaya, which from 1926 became the center of Ust-Bolsheretsky District.

Fish

The river is used by locals and tourists for fishing from rafts or boats. 
Fish species include rainbow trout, char, grayling, Chinook salmon, coho salmon, sockeye salmon, chum salmon and pink salmon.

References

Sources

Rivers of Kamchatka Krai
Tributaries of the Bolshaya